Rambha (born Vijayalakshmi; 5 June 1976) is an Indian actress. In a career spanning of almost two decades, Rambha had appeared in more than 100 films across eight regional languages, predominantly in Telugu and Tamil, in addition to Malayalam, Kannada, and Hindi along with few Bengali, Bhojpuri and English films. She was one of the prominent actresses in India in the 90s and 2000s.

Early life and background
Rambha was born as Vijayalakshmi in Vijayawada, Andhra Pradesh on 5 June 1976 into a Telugu family. She did her schooling at Atkinsons Senior Secondary School, Vijayawada. While she was studying in her seventh standard, she acted as Ammavaru (Mother Goddess) for her school's Annual Day competition. The event had been attended by director Hariharan who stayed in contact and later introduced her as the female lead in Malayalam film, Sargam. Her first on-screen name was Amrutha, which she later changed as Rambha after the character name in her Telugu debut movie Aa Okkati Adakku.

Career
Rambha gave up her education aged 15 and then started her career with Hariharan's Malayalam film Sargam (1992) opposite Vineeth. The film performed well at the box office, and she was spotted by director E. V. V. Satyanarayana who then cast her in the Telugu film Aa Okkati Adakku (1992), where she was paired opposite Rajendra Prasad. The film performed well and prompted several films offers for the actress from several different film industries across India. During the height of her career in the late 1990s, Rambha deliberately continued to pick glamorous roles to garner film offers. In successful films such as Hitler (1997) starring Chiranjeevi, Rambha appeared in roles which were inconsequential to the plot and purely depicted as the lead actor's love interest.

She started her career as a producer with help of her brother in Three Roses (2003), in which Jyothika, Laila and Rambha played the lead characters. However, the film failed at the box office, and she fell heavily into debt after the film's release. She sold her house at Mount Road, Chennai in order to pay the debt, while she was also booked in a cheque-bounce case filed by the financiers of the movie.

Rambha has acted in several languages and always maintained a successful balance in Malayalam, Telugu, Tamil, Hindi, Kannada, Bhojpuri and Bengali. In 2010, Rambha shot alongside Prakash Raj for a thriller film titled Vidiyum Varai Kathiru. The film was shot in three languages namely Tamil, Telugu and Malayalam, but the film did not have a theatrical release.

After her marriage she had given up films as she felt her popularity in films has faded away where she notice that she was not getting meaty roles as she used to and has judged a very popular Tamil TV show Maanada Mayilada, and the Telugu dance show Dhee. After a long gap she came back from Toronto, she appeared as a judge of Zee Telugu dance show ABCD-Anybody Can Dance and judged Kings of Comedy Juniors on Vijay TV.

She is a brand ambassador for Kolors health care, Chennai.

Personal life
Rambha married Indrakumar Pathmanathan, a Canada-based Sri Lankan Tamil businessman, on 8 April 2010 at Karnataka Kalyana Mandapam in Tirumala. They settled in Toronto. They have two daughters and a son.

Filmography
In the order of languages in which she appeared the most to the least.

Telugu

Tamil

Hindi

Kannada

Malayalam

Bengali

Bhojpuri

English

Television

References

External links
 
 
 

1976 births
Living people
Indian film actresses
Indian television actresses
Telugu actresses
Actresses in Bengali cinema
Actresses in Bhojpuri cinema
Actresses in Hindi cinema
Actresses in Kannada cinema
Actresses in Malayalam cinema
Actresses in Tamil cinema
Actresses in Telugu cinema
Actresses in Telugu television
Actresses in Tamil television
Actresses from Vijayawada
20th-century Indian actresses
21st-century Indian actresses